Carrickstone  is an area of Cumbernauld, Scotland. It is on the north of the M80 and west of Cumbernauld Town Centre. The area it now occupies used to be covered by Carrickstone farm with the 25 inch Ordnance Survey map showing it between an ancient "standing stone" and The Village.

Toponymy
The historical etymology of Carrickstone's name is uncertain although it is now undoubtedly tied to the Roman altar.

History
Carrickstone is named after the only Roman altar still in the open air in Scotland.  John Watson in the New Statistical Account of Scotland described the stone long before the modern settlement took shape. The stone has also been linked with Robert Bruce, being the place where he reportedly set up his standard on his way to Bannockburn. There is a some evidence that coffins were laid on top of the stone on their way to the cemetery in Kirkintilloch and that the stone has been somewhat worn away. Several old documents show Carrickstone including maps by Charles Ross, and William Roy.

References

Areas of Cumbernauld